"Cooler than Me" is the debut single by American singer Mike Posner. It was released on April 16, 2010, as the lead single from his debut studio album 31 Minutes to Takeoff (2010). It peaked at #6 on the Billboard Hot 100 and reached #1 on Billboard's Hot Dance Airplay in its July 31, 2010 issue. The instrumental was produced by Gigamesh. Another version, labeled "Gigamesh Remix", was released on Mike Posner's October 2009 mixtape One Foot Out the Door. The original version features hip-hop rapper Big Sean. The song was produced and engineered by Gigamesh.

Background
Speaking in August 2010 to noted British urban writer Pete Lewis – Assistant Editor of Blues & Soul – Posner described the background to the song: "A lotta people don’t know I recorded that song while I was still a student, and that I recorded it in my dorm-room on an extremely cheap microphone! So to now be hearing it on the radio in the States and over here is very special for me, knowing that I made it in such a makeshift manner. And while yes, it is about a specific girl in my class I had a crush on – though I’m not gonna tell you her name, because she doesn’t deserve any notoriety – it’s also about a specific type of girl. Because there are girls like that everywhere! You know, everybody knows that girl who thinks she’s cooler than them, which is why I figured I’d just try to capture that moment of feeling snubbed. Because all my songs are either driven by something that’s happened to me, or by something I’ve felt on the inside.”

Music video

In the music video, Posner starts out at a concert singing some of his songs before an enthusiastic audience. After the show he goes driving with his friends, who then drop him off at the Roosevelt Hotel on Los Angeles' Hollywood Blvd.  After a short ride in an elevator, Posner enters a hotel suite, where he finds a party in freeze frame. As soon as Posner dons a pair of sunglasses, the party comes to life.

Throughout the course of the video, Posner tries on different styles of sunglasses including Oakley Razorblades, Holbrooks, Jupiters, Frogskins, and 3D glasses. While he is trying each pair on, it evokes a different perception of the party currently going on in the hotel room. In the end, he is seen leaving the hotel that morning with his old sunglasses back on.

The video, directed by Jason Beattie, features cameos by Louie Vito, The Dingo, Chanel West Coast (Chelsea Dudley), and Christopher Pfaff from Rob Dyrdek's Fantasy Factory.

The music video premiered in early April 2010 and uploaded on May 26, 2010, on Vevo online. It premiered on television in the UK on September 28, 2010.

Media usage
On May 18, 2010, Electronic Arts announced that "Cooler than Me" would be featured in the Sims 3: Ambitions video game. The song was converted to "Simlish", the language of the Sims.

Posner appeared on TBS's Lopez Tonight on May 31, 2010, with a performance of "Cooler than Me" (Gigamesh Remix), as well as America's Got Talent on July 28, 2010. Posner also performed the song on The Ellen DeGeneres Show premiere week in its eighth season.

The song was used to promote a season of Beauty and the Geek Australia, which aired on the Seven Network in Australia throughout 2010.

On October 2, 2010, the song was performed by Cher Lloyd on seventh series of the British TV talent competition The X Factor, during the judges' houses stage of the competition, but she was unable to finish the song in front of Cheryl Cole and will.i.am due to a case of tonsillitis. In spite of this, she made it through to the live shows.

On October 16, 2010, the song was covered at the end of an episode of the British TV comedy Harry Hill's TV Burp, by a man and his wife who had appeared on a parodic video on the show earlier in the evening.

For Body Pump 76, "Cooler than Me" has been used for Abs track. On December 8, 2010, the a-cappella group Groove for Thought covered the song on the second episode of second season of The Sing-Off.

It was also covered in the 2011 season of the Australian version of The X Factor by boy band Young Men Society, who made it to the top eight before being eliminated.

The song is featured on the re-mastered edition of Grand Theft Auto V for PlayStation 4, PC and Xbox One versions released on November 18, 2014. It can be heard on Non-Stop-Pop FM.

Charts and certifications

Weekly charts

Year-end charts

Certifications

Release history

See also
List of U.S. number-one dance airplay hits of 2010

References

2010 debut singles
2009 songs
Mike Posner songs
Songs written by Mike Posner
Songs written by Big Sean
J Records singles
Electropop songs